The 2007 Leinster Junior Football Championship is the Junior "knockout" competition in the game of football played in the province of Leinster in Ireland. The series of games are organised by the Leinster Council. The Leinster football Final is played in Croke Park, Dublin.

Quarter finals

Semi finals

(5) 1 v 2, Newbridge/Navan, June 13.
(6) 3 v 4, Parnell Park/Drogheda, June 13.
Final: 5 v 6, Home venue of 5, June 27.

References

Leinster Junior Football Championship
Leinster Junior Football Championship